El Dibir is a town in the central Mudug region of Somalia.

References

Populated places in Mudug